Kristen A. Lindquist is a psychologist and affective neuroscientist whose research focuses on language, emotions, and culture. Lindquist is known for her work on emotion words, suggesting that when speakers of different languages talk about common emotions like love, they may not mean the same thing. Her findings run counter to the view that there are universal emotions that are experienced the same across cultures. Lindquist is Associate Professor of Psychology and Neuroscience and Director of Carolina Affective Science Lab at the University of North Carolina, Chapel Hill.

Lindquist received the Rising Star Award from the Association for Psychological Science in 2013 and is a Fellow of the Society of Experimental Social Psychology.

Biography 
Lindquist received a B.A. in Psychology and English from Boston College in 2004, and her Ph.D. in Psychology from Boston College in 2010, where she was a student of Lisa Feldman Barrett. Lindquist was a postdoctoral fellow at the Harvard University Mind/Brain/Behavior Initiative and the Martinos Center for Biomedical Imaging at Massachusetts General Hospital, where she worked with Bradford Dickerson.

After completing her Ph.D, Lindquist joined the faculty of the Department of Psychology and Neuroscience at the University of North Carolina, Chapel Hill where she is a member of the Social Psychology Program and the Human Neuroimaging Group. She received the UNC Office of the Provost Johnston Excellence in Teaching Award in 2016. Lindquist serves as Associate Editor of the Journal of Experimental Psychology: General. She is one of the co-founders of the Emotion News blog.

Research 
Lindquist studies emotions and affective neuroscience. She believes that in order to understand how emotions impact decision making and interpersonal communication, and how they go awry, psychological and neural mechanisms must be understood. Her research has demonstrated how body changes, emotional concepts, and attention form emotional experiences and perceptions, which then map on to distributed brain networks.

Using the tools of social cognition, physiology and neuroscience, Lindquist works to understand how people experience emotions in their bodies and how they see emotions in others. Among her studies, Lindquist found how words play a crucial part in forming recognizable emotions from experiences; that the brain categorizes information using language and groups abstract feelings into coherent categories. Through analysis of emotion words in 2,474 languages, Lindquist and her colleagues found that word meanings can vary widely across cultures. Using the phenomenon of colexification, which is when a word names two or more concepts, they found that "emotions cluster differently in different languages."

Representative publications 

 Lindquist, K. A., & Barrett, L. F. (2008). Emotional complexity. In M. Lewis, J. M. Haviland-Jones, & L. F. Barrett (Eds.), Handbook of emotions (p. 513–530). The Guilford Press.
Lindquist, K. A., & Barrett, L. F. (2012). A functional architecture of the human brain: emerging insights from the science of emotion. Trends in Cognitive Sciences, 16(11), 533-540.
Lindquist, K. A., Barrett, L. F., Bliss-Moreau, E., & Russell, J. A. (2006). Language and the perception of emotion. Emotion, 6(1), 125.
 Lindquist, K. A., & Gendron, M. (2013). What's in a word? Language constructs emotion perception. Emotion Review, 5(1), 66-71.
Lindquist, K. A., Wager, T. D., Kober, H., Bliss-Moreau, E., & Barrett, L. F. (2012). The brain basis of emotion: a meta-analytic review. Behavioral and Brain Sciences, 35(3), 121-143.

References

External links 

 Faculty Homepage
 Carolina Affective Science Lab
 

American neuroscientists
American women psychologists
Morrissey College of Arts & Sciences alumni
University of North Carolina at Chapel Hill faculty
Year of birth missing (living people)
Living people
American women academics
21st-century American women